This is a list of numbered Regiments of Cavalry of the British Army from the mid-18th century until 1922 when various amalgamations were implemented. The Life Guards were formed following the end of the English Civil War as troops of Life Guards between 1658 and 1659. Regiments were subsequently raised as part of the response to (i) the Monmouth Rebellion in 1685 (ii) the Jacobite rising in 1715 (iii) the Seven Years' War in 1759 and (iv) the Indian Rebellion in 1858.

The designation "dragoon guards" was introduced in 1746 to recognise the importance of some of the most senior regiments, who rode large strong horses, without actually increasing their pay. The more junior regiments, who rode lighter horses, were designated "dragoons" at that time, although some of them were subsequently re-designated "lancers" or "hussars".

The full list is as follows:

Household cavalry:

Heavy cavalry

Light cavalry:

Notes

References

Cavalry of the British Army